Giorgi Navalovski (born 28 June 1986) is a retired Georgian footballer. 

Dubbed as the Georgian Gattuso for physical similarities with the Serie A star, during his 18 year-long career Navalovski played as a left back for several clubs in five countries and the national team.

Career

Club career
Navalovski's first steps in football started at Avaza school, followed by 35th football school, where he drew attention from Dinamo Tbilisi scouts. First he joined the reserve team of this Georgian top club and shortly under Kakha Tskhadadze made his debut in Umaglesi Liga. In this year he won the first champion's title with Dinamo.  

After one year at Olimpi Rustavi, he spent next seven seasons abroad. In June 2015, he joined Dila Gori, which had become the league champion a month earlier. In July he took part in both Champions League qualifying matches against Partizan.

Navalovski signed a contract with Veria on 29 June 2016.

On 27 December 2016, Navalovski signed for Neftchi Baku, terminating his contract by mutual consent on 20 July 2017.

On 26 July 2017, Navalovski signed for Russian Premier League side SKA-Khabarovsk for his third stint with the club.

In the summer of 2018 he moved to Minsk, where he remained for six months.  

Early next year Navalovski returned to Georgia to sign for Dinamo Batumi. He was a regular member of the team for four full seasons, once winning the league and three times the silver medals. His retirement was announced in late 2022.

International career
Navalovski made his debut for the national team in a 1–1 draw against Estonia on 27 May 2008. After participating in another friendly game against Portugal four days later, he did not play again until 2015. Navalovski made contribution to Georgia's successful UEFA Nations League campaign in 2018. Overall, he played 41 matches and retired in 2021.

Career statistics

Notes

Honours
Azerbaijan Premier League

	Winner	(1):	2009/2010

Erovnuli Liga	

 Winner (2): 2004/2005, 2021

 Runner-up	(3):	2019, 2020, 2022 

Russian First League

	Winner (1):	2009

 Runner-up	(1):	2010

Georgian Super Cup

	Winner	(2): 2005/2006, 2022
 
 Runner-up	(2):	2007/2008, 2015/2016

Personal information
Navalovski is married with two children. 

The Navalovski family comes from Poland. After Giorgi's great grandfather moved to Georgia, his descendants settled in Tbilisi and Telavi.

References

External links
  Statistics at Sportbox.ru

1986 births
Living people
Georgian people of Russian descent
Footballers from Georgia (country)
Association football defenders
Georgia (country) international footballers
Expatriate footballers from Georgia (country)
Expatriate footballers in Russia
Expatriate footballers in Azerbaijan
Expatriate footballers in Greece
Expatriate footballers in Belarus
Super League Greece players
Russian Premier League players
FC Dinamo Tbilisi players
FC Metalurgi Rustavi players
FC Anzhi Makhachkala players
Shamakhi FK players
FC Volga Nizhny Novgorod players
FC Khimki players
FC Novokuznetsk players
FC SKA-Khabarovsk players
FC Tosno players
FC Dila Gori players
Neftçi PFK players
Veria F.C. players
FC Dinamo Minsk players
FC Dinamo Batumi players
Expatriate sportspeople from Georgia (country) in Azerbaijan